Kudamurutti River a tributary of the Kaveri, is one of the five sacred rivers flows in Thiruvaiyaru in the Thanjavur District of the state of Tamil Nadu, in southeastern India. Kudamurutti River joins the Cauvery River at Tiruchirapalli. Ancient name of this river was kaduvaai which was mentioned in Tevaram, Tamil Saivite devotional poetry. The river is related to the famous saint Sri Narayana Tirth who is believed to have been attained enlightenment here. As it is believed to be a sacred river, River Kudamurtti is the Theertham of Tiruvalampozhil Temple. There are many Temples located beside of the river namely, Vishahareswara Temple, Kalyana Varadharaja Perumal Temple.
At the end of kudamuruti river at Kaveri, there located a famous temple of goddess AYYALAMAN

References

Rivers of Tamil Nadu
Tributaries of the Kaveri River
Rivers of India